The Walsall and District Football Association Senior Cup is an English football competition for clubs in and around Walsall, with the Final taking place at Walsall F.C.'s Bescot Stadium. The current holders are Chasetown, who won the 2013-14 competition by beating Rushall Olympic.

Finals since World War II
Dates refer to the year in which the final itself took place, so the 1946 listing refers to the final of the 1945-46 competition.

References
General
 page on West Midlands (Regional) League website
Specific

Sport in Walsall
Football cup competitions in England
Football in the West Midlands (county)